Tebble is a surname. Notable people with the surname include:

Bill Tebble (1928–2004), Australian rules footballer
Norman Tebble (1924–1998), British marine biologist
Pat Tebble (1903–1968), Australian rules footballer

See also
Tebbe